Jonathan Worth Daniels (April 26, 1902 – November 6, 1981) was an American writer, editor, and White House Press Secretary. He was a founding member of the Peabody Awards Board of Jurors, serving from 1940 until 1950. For most of his life, he worked at The News & Observer, and later founded The Island Packet.

Education

Jonathan Worth Daniels was the son of Josephus Daniels and Addie Worth Bagley Daniels. He attended Centennial School in Raleigh from 1908 to 1913.  When his father became United States Secretary of the Navy in 1913, the family moved to Washington, D.C., where he studied at the John Eaton School from 1913 to 1915, and St. Albans School from 1915 to 1918.  Daniels attended the University of North Carolina at Chapel Hill, and graduated in 1921 with a B.A. He continued at UNC for graduate school, earning an M.A. in English in 1921.  As a student in Chapel Hill, he edited The Daily Tar Heel and participated in the Carolina Playmakers. Daniels passed the North Carolina bar exam despite failing out of Columbia University Law School, but never practiced law.

White House Press Secretary
After World War II began, Daniels went into government service, first as assistant director of the Office of Civilian Defense and later as one of six administrative assistants for President Franklin D. Roosevelt (who had worked under Josephus Daniels during World War I). In March 1945, less than one month before his death, Roosevelt named Daniels his press secretary, and he continued in the position temporarily under President Harry S. Truman. Daniels' 47-day term serving as White House Press Secretary was the shortest of any White House Press Secretary  until that of Jerald terHorst, who was Gerald Ford's first Press Secretary for 31 days.

Later life
Daniels returned to The News & Observer in 1947 and became its editor in 1948, upon the death of his father.

In 1966, he revealed the affair between Roosevelt and Lucy Mercer Rutherfurd in his book The Time Between the Wars. He died in 1981.

Books
Clash of Angels
New York: Brewer and Warren (1930)
The Devil's Backbone: The Story of the Natchez Trace
New York: McGraw-Hill (1962) (Also published in later editions) 
The End of Innocence
Philadelphia: J. B. Lippincott & Co. (1954) (Also published in later editions)
Frontier on the Potomac
New York: Macmillan (1946) (Also published in a later edition)
The Gentlemanly Serpent and Other Columns from a Newspaperman in Paradise: From the Pages of the Hilton Head Island Packet, 1970-73
Columbia: University of South Carolina Press (1974)
The Man of Independence
Philadelphia: J. B. Lippincott & Co. (1950) (Also published in a later editions)
Mosby: Gray Ghost of the Confederacy
Philadelphia: J. B. Lippincott & Co. (1959)
Ordeal of Ambition: Jefferson, Hamilton, Burr
Garden City, N.Y: Doubleday (1970)
Prince of Carpetbaggers
Philadelphia: J. B. Lippincott & Co. (1958)
The Randolphs of Virginia
Garden City, N.Y.: Doubleday (1972)
Robert E. Lee
Boston: Houghton, Mifflin (1960)
A Southerner Discovers New England
New York: Macmillan (1940)
A Southerner Discovers the South
New York: Macmillan, (1938) (Also published in a later edition)
Stonewall Jackson
New York: Random House (1959)
Tar Heels: A Portrait of North Carolina
New York: Dodd, Mead (1941) (Also published in a later edition) 
They Will Be Heard: America's Crusading Newspaper Editors
New York: McGraw-Hill (1965)
The Times Between the Wars: Armistice to Pearl Harbor
Garden City, N.Y.: Doubleday (1966) (Also published in a later edition)
Washington Quadrille: The Dance beside the Documents
Garden City, N.Y.: Doubleday (1968)
White House Witness, 1942-1945
Garden City, N.Y.: Doubleday (1975)

Notes

References
North Carolina Award citation

External links
 Oral Interview with Jonathan Daniels at Truman Library
 Inventory of the Jonathan Daniels Papers, 1865-1982, in the Southern Historical Collection, UNC-Chapel Hill
 Oral History Interview with Jonathan Worth Daniels at Oral Histories of the American South
Jennifer Ritterhouse, "Dixie Destinations: Rereading Jonathan Daniels' A Southerner Discovers the South", Southern Spaces, 20 May 2010.

1902 births
1981 deaths
20th-century American writers
American editors
St. Albans School (Washington, D.C.) alumni
The News & Observer
University of North Carolina at Chapel Hill alumni
White House Press Secretaries
20th-century American male writers
Columbia Law School alumni